Theodora Thayer (1868-1905) was an  American painter best known for her miniatures.

She studied with Joseph DeCamp in Boston.

Thayer taught at the New York School of Art and the Art Students League and was a founding member of the American Society of Miniature Painters.

“Her fine portrait of Bliss Carman is considered one of the memorable achievements in American miniature painting.”

Works
Thayer's works can be found in collections at:
 Swarthmore College, Swarthmore, Pennsylvania
 Metropolitan Museum of Art, New York, New York
 Cincinnati Art Museum, Cincinnati, Ohio
 Museum of Fine Arts, Boston, Massachusetts
 Harvard University, Law School, Cambridge, Massachusetts

References

1868 births
1905 deaths
19th-century American painters
19th-century American women artists
American women painters
Art Students League of New York faculty
American portrait painters